Allaire Corporation was a computer software company founded by Jeremy and JJ Allaire in Minnesota, later headquartered in Cambridge, then Newton, Massachusetts. It commenced operations in May 1995, had its initial public offering on NASDAQ (trading ticker ALLR) in January 1999, and was acquired by rival Macromedia in early 2001.

History
Allaire released the first version of the ColdFusion server in 1995, the first database-driven web-content server. In its early history, the name of the language for ColdFusion, then known as Database Markup Language (DBML), was changed to ColdFusion Markup Language (CFML). The company also produced two web design IDEs: HomeSite, purchased from Bradbury Software, and ColdFusion Studio, based on HomeSite with enhancements tailored to development of ColdFusion applications.

In 2000, Allaire acquired Live Software, a company founded by Paul Colton in 1997 and best known for the creation of the first commercial Java Servlet and JSP server, JRun. Later in 2000, Allaire also acquired the Kawa IDE (Java IDE) from Tek-Tools Software and much of the Kawa development team relocated from Dallas to Boston.

Allaire also produced an early web Content Management System (CMS) called Spectra.

JRun was purchased by Macromedia, which in 2001 also purchased Allaire. In 2005, Macromedia was purchased by Adobe Systems.

References

External links

Companies based in Cambridge, Massachusetts
Software companies disestablished in 2001
Software companies established in 1995
American companies disestablished in 2001
American companies established in 1995
Defunct computer companies based in Massachusetts
Defunct software companies of the United States